Toby E. Huff was born in Portland, Maine, on April 24, 1942. He was trained as a sociologist but has been increasingly drawn to questions in the history, philosophy and sociology of science. Those inquiries led him to undertake Max Weber-inspired studies of the Arab and Muslim world, as well as China, including field work in Malaysia.

He is best known for his book The Rise of Early Modern Science: Islam, China and the West, now in a third edition. It has been translated into Arabic, Turkish, Korean and Chinese. Related writings have been translated into Russian and Swedish.Career and contributions
Huff earned a B.A. from Northeastern University, a Master's from Northwestern University, and his Ph.D. from The New School For Social Research in 1971. He was a member of the Institute for Advanced Study in Princeton, New Jersey (1978–79) and prior to that was a Post-doctoral Fellow at the University of California, Berkeley working with Robert Bellah.

Huff has been a visiting scholar at the National University of Singapore, the University of Malaya, and the Max Weber College in Erfurt, Germany. He taught sociology for thirty-four years at the University of Massachusetts Dartmouth before becoming chancellor professor emeritus in 2005. Since then he has been a research associate in the Department of Astronomy at Harvard University.

At the New School Huff's mentor was Benjamin Nelson who was then taking up “the Needham Question,” the question of why modern science arose only in the West and not in China. Influenced by Nelson but also Robert Merton, Huff continued that line of inquiry that resulted in The Rise of Early Modern Science: Islam, China and the West. It has been translated into Arabic, Turkish, Korean and Chinese. It is still being used in classroom teaching seventeen years after its first publication. By exploring questions in the history of science in the Arab-Muslim world, Huff further extended questions initially raised by R. K. Merton about religious and institutional  factors supporting 17th century science in England. By questioning the cultural embeddedness of science in Islamic culture and civilization, Huff also stimulated controversy.

That discussion has been taken a step further by exploring evidence of scientific curiosity in China, Mughal India, and the Ottoman Empire in comparison to Europe in the seventeenth century. The results of that inquiry are in his Intellectual Curiosity and the Scientific Revolution. A Global Perspective.

Additional influence of Max Weber on Huff can be seen in two books, his Max Weber and the Methodology of the Social Sciences;  and Max Weber and Islam, co-edited with Wolfgang Schluchter.

Early in his career Huff was influenced by a number of philosophers of science, especially N.R. Hanson and Karl Popper.  That intersection of questions in the philosophy and history of science is seen in his contribution to the Karl Popper Centenary volume: The Open Society, Metaphysical Beliefs , and Platonic Sources of  Reason ad Rationality''.

Publications
 On the  Roads to Modernity. Conscience, Science, and Civilizations, Selected writings of Benjamin Nelson (1981)
 
 
  Co-authored with Wolfgang Schlucter.
 
 
 
 “Some Historical Roots of the Ethos of Science,” Journal of Classical Sociology, 7/2 (2007)

References

American sociologists
1942 births
Living people
Academics from Portland, Maine
Northeastern University alumni
Northwestern University alumni